Radzanów  is a village in Mława County, Masovian Voivodeship, in east-central Poland, approximately  south-west of Mława and  north-west of Warsaw. It is the seat of the gmina (administrative district) called Gmina Radzanów.

The village lies on the Wkra river. It has a population of 930, with the population of the surrounding gmina exceeding 4,000 inhabitants.

History
In the 13th century Radzanów was a residence of the Radzanowski family, which expired in 1630. They bore the Prawdzic coat of arms. The settlement received town privileges based on Chełmno rights in 1400 from Mazovian Prince Siemowit IV. It legally held a weekly market and an annual fair. A castle built on the bank of Wkra river during the period was completely destroyed during the Swedish invasion in the 17th century. The current village was stripped of its town rights in 1869 by the Tsarist administration of partitioned Poland.

Around 1380 a parish was established in Radzanów that erected its first church, mentioned in 1439. The church was destroyed in around 1590, rebuilt in around 1598 and survived until the early 18th century. A second church was built in 1734. However, it was not until 1870 that the first brick-and-mortar church was erected in Radzanów.

Jewish community

Jews began to settle in Radzanów in considerable numbers around the second half of the 18th century as a result of a privilege issued by the town's owner Dorota Niszczycka, the Chamberlain of Płock from the Karczewski clan. She allocated to the Jewish Kehilla two streets and a plot of her land for a Jewish cemetery and a synagogue, as well as the right to trade in all goods and the production of alcohol. The cemetery, which was established in 1765 near the Wkra river (7,500 sq m in size), was levelled by the German occupiers in World War II and all the tombstones were removed. The synagogue houses the town's public library.

In 1857, there were 571 Jews out of the total population of 1,040 people. By 1865, Jews accounted for 45 percent of the town's inhabitants. In the second half of the 19th century the Kehilla built a brick synagogue designed by S. Kmita with Moorish-style motifs, in place of the original wooden one. The Jewish community (population 532 by 1900) was completely destroyed in the Holocaust, with about 200 of its members deported in January 1942 to the ghetto in Mława, and from there to Treblinka and Auschwitz death camps in November 1942. Today there are no Jews in Radzanów. The synagogue was entered into the national register of historic monuments in 1975 and repaired in 1986.

Economy
Radzanów and its county (with Bieżuń and Żuromin nearby) is one of the largest producers of poultry and eggs in the Mazovia. A waste treatment plant in the town called "Bacutil" services the northern part of the province, while the social infrastructure includes a medical clinic, post office, cultural centre and public library, as well as a number of stores and service stations. The water-supply pipes cover all of the gmina. The Era GSM cell-phone tower was erected in 2001.

References

Further reading 
 Yizkor Books: Radzanow. New York Public Library - Dorot Jewish Division. 1960. 
 Gruber, Samuel, Phyllis Myers, Jan Jagielski, and Eleonora Bergman. Survey of Historic Jewish Monuments in Poland: A Report to the United States Commission for the Preservation of America's Heritage Abroad. New York: Jewish Heritage Council, World Monuments Fund, 1995. p. 46. 
 Miron, Gai; Shulhani, Shlomit. The Yad Vashem Encyclopedia of the Ghettos During the Holocaust. Jerusalem: Yad Vashem, 2009. p. 488.  
 Mokotoff, Gary, Sallyann Amdur Sack, and Alexander Sharon. Where Once We Walked: A Guide to the Jewish Communities Destroyed in the Holocaust. Bergenfield, NJ: Avotaynu, 2002.  
 Spector, Shmuel and Geoffrey Wigoder. The Encyclopedia of Jewish Life Before and During the Holocaust: K-Sered. Jerusalem: Yad Vashem, 2001. p. 1050.  
 Wein, Abraham (1989). Pinkas Hakehillot: Encyclopaedia of Jewish Communities, Poland, Vol. IV: Warsaw and Its Region=Pinkas hakehillot Polin: entsiklopedyah shel ha-yishuvim ha-Yehudiyim le-min hivasdam ve-`ad le-ahar Sho'at Milhemet ha-`olam ha-sheniyah (in Hebrew). Jerusalem: Yad Vashem. pp. 417–418.

External links 
 Radzanów Portal Internetowy
 

Villages in Mława County
Synagogues in Poland
Holocaust locations in Poland